Keli Corpse (born May 14, 1974) is a Canadian former professional ice hockey player. He is currently the head coach of the Ayr Centennials of the Southern Ontario Junior Hockey League. Corpse was selected by the Montreal Canadiens in the 2nd round (44th overall) of the 1992 NHL Entry Draft.

Born in 1974 in London, Ontario, Corpse played in the Ontario Hockey League with the Kingston Frontenacs. He also played with the Canada men's national ice hockey team during the 1992-93 and 1994-1995 seasons.

Career statistics

Awards and honours

References

External links

Living people
1974 births
Adirondack IceHawks players
Baltimore Bandits players
Border City Bandits players
Canadian ice hockey centres
Fort Wayne Komets players
Grand Rapids Griffins players
Ice hockey people from Ontario
Kingston Frontenacs players
Montreal Canadiens draft picks
Pensacola Ice Pilots players
Port Huron Border Cats players
Quad City Mallards (UHL) players
Rockford IceHogs (UHL) players
Sportspeople from London, Ontario
Wheeling Nailers players
Wheeling Thunderbirds players